Mi Aaji  Aur Saheb  was an Indian soap opera on Imagine TV.  The serial covered the relationship between grandparents and their grandchildren. Its broadcast began on February 6, 2012, and ended on April 12, 2012, due to Imagine TV's abrupt shutdown.

Plot
The show is set against the backdrop of Ushodaya colony and highlights the essence of relationships between a grandmother, her grandchild and their Saheb that triumphs all obstacles. Me Aajji Aur Sahib showcased how different relationships grow, mature and evolve with time, circumstances and age.

Ratings
The show opened to a TRP of 0.8 and continued getting TRPs in a range of 0.5 to 0.8. It was also the channels 3rd best show in 2012.

Cast and characters

Imagine TV original programming
2011 Indian television series debuts
2012 Indian television series endings